The Slender lizardfish (Saurida elongata) is a species of lizardfish that lives mainly in the Northwest Pacific.

References
 

Synodontidae
Fish described in 1846

zh:长条蛇鲻